Lugazi Power Station is a   bagasse-fired thermal power plant in Uganda, the third-largest economy in the East African Community.

Location
The power station is located on the campus of Sugar Corporation of Uganda Limited, the owners of the power station. This is located in the town of Lugazi, in Buikwe District, in Central Uganda. The coordinates of the power station are:0°22'48.0"N, 32°56'42.0"E (Latitude:0.3800; Longitude:32.9450).

Overview
Lugazi Power Station is owned and operated by Sugar Corporation of Uganda Limited (SCOUL), the third-largest sugar manufacturer in Uganda. The power station was designed and built around the sugar manufacturing plant of SCOUL. The fibrous residue from the process of crushing sugar cane, known as bagasse, is burnt to heat water in boilers and produce steam. The steam is pressurized and used to drive turbines which then generate electricity. The excess heat is used in the sugar manufacturing process. , the power station was capable of producing a maximum of 5MW of electricity, which was fully utilized internally by SCOUL. At that time, plans were underway to expand power production to 16MW, of which 7.4MW was to be sold to the grid and the remaining 8.6 was for internal use by SCOUL.

Upgrade
In May 2018, SCOUL borrowed €20 million from PROPARCO and another €20 million from Netherlands Development Finance Company (FMO), to finance a new  bagasse co-generation power plant.

See also

References

External links
All Uganda's Three Major Sugar Factories Co-generate Electricity From Bagasse
Analysis of Uganda's Present And Future Electricity Needs And Sources

Bagasse-fired power stations in Uganda
Buikwe District